George Emanuel Toomey (October 17, 1873 – c. 1932) was an American football coach.  He served as the head football coach at Colorado Agricultural College—now known as Colorado State University for one season, in 1900, compiling a record of 1–3.  He forced to resign following a scandal in 1901 regarding his playing a professional player. Toomey graduated from University of Denver in 1898, where he was a member of the baseball team, the Beta Theta Pi fraternity, and leader of the glee club. His hometown was Cottonwood Falls, Kansas, and he had previously attended Baker University. In 1900, Toomey had also been named professor of Oratory at Colorado State.

He later returned to Kansas where he was an evangelist. He died around 1932.

Head coaching record

References

1873 births
Year of death missing
19th-century players of American football
Baker Wildcats football players
Colorado State Rams football coaches
Denver Pioneers baseball players
People from Americus, Kansas
People from Cottonwood Falls, Kansas